"Highwayman" is a song written by American singer-songwriter Jimmy Webb about a soul with incarnations in four different places in time and history: as a highwayman, a sailor, a construction worker on the Hoover Dam, and finally as a captain of a starship. The song was influenced by the real-life hanged highwayman Jonathan Wild. Webb first recorded the song on his album El Mirage, released in May 1977. The following year, Glen Campbell recorded his version on his 1979 album Highwayman.

In 1985, the song became the inspiration for the naming of the supergroup the Highwaymen, which featured Johnny Cash, Waylon Jennings, Willie Nelson, and Kris Kristofferson. Their first album, Highwayman, became a number one platinum-selling album, and their version of the song went to number one on the Hot Country Songs Billboard chart in a 20-week run. Their version earned Webb a Grammy Award for Best Country Song in 1986. The song has since been recorded by other artists. Webb himself included a different version on his 1996 album Ten Easy Pieces, a live version on his 2007 album Live and at Large, a version with his sons (Christiaan, Justin and James) The Webb Brothers on their 2009 album Cottonwood Farm, and a duet version with Mark Knopfler on the 2010 album Just Across the River.

Composition
According to Webb, he wrote the song in London while he was finishing up work on his album El Mirage. After a late-night round of "professional drinking" with his friend Harry Nilsson, Webb went to sleep and had "an incredibly vivid dream":

Webb included the phrasing in the line "Along the coach roads I did ride" to convey a kind of "antique way of speaking". Not sure of where the song was leading him, Webb realized that the highwayman character does not die, but becomes reincarnated, and the three subsequent verses evolve from that idea. In the second verse he becomes a sailor, in the third verse a dam builder, and in the fourth verse Webb switches to future tense and the character becomes an astronaut who will someday "fly a starship across the universe divide".

Jimmy Webb version
Webb's version of the song was first released on the album El Mirage in May 1977.

Glen Campbell version
Webb then brought the song to Glen Campbell, who recorded it in 1978. Campbell eventually released the song on his album Highwayman in October 1979.

Finn Kalvik version
The Norwegian singer Finn Kalvik recorded a translated version of the song called "Fredløs" for his 1981 album "Natt og Dag".

Finnish version
Pate Mustajärvi, Harri Marstio, Jorma Kääriäinen and Topi Sorsakoski recorded a Finnish version called "Elän vieläkin". Finnish lyrics were written by Hara Laukkanen, Eeki Mantere and Juha Tapaninen. In this version the story is told with references to local history: the characters are a prisoner, lumberjack, soldier and singer.

The Highwaymen version

In 1984, Campbell played the song "Highwayman" for Johnny Cash, who was making a quartet album with Willie Nelson, Waylon Jennings, and Kris Kristofferson. A few years earlier, Webb brought the song to Jennings, but Jennings, having heard the Campbell version, said "I just couldn't see it then." The four were all together in Switzerland doing a television special and decided that they should do a project together. While the four were recording their first album, Marty Stuart again played the song for Cash, saying it would be perfect for them—four verses, four souls, and four of them. Campbell then played the song again, this time to all four of them, and the quartet had the name for their new supergroup, the Highwaymen, the name of their first album, Highwayman, and the name of their first single. The four thought it was a perfect name for them because they were always on the road and all four had the image of being outlaws in country music.

In the Highwaymen's version of the song, each of the four verses was sung by a different performer: first Nelson as the highwayman, then Kristofferson as the sailor, then Jennings as the dam builder, and finally Cash as the starship captain. Webb later observed, "I don't know how they decided who would take which verse, but having Johnny last was like having God singing your song." Rosanne Cash has said her father did not realize the song was about reincarnation until she explained it to him.

A black-and-white music video was released, which used actors to re-enact the song's lyrics, including the deaths of the first three characters. Each of the performers is seen briefly in the sky singing a few lines, as their segment of the song concludes.  The video wraps up with the faces of Jennings, Nelson, Cash and Kristofferson lined up, similar to the presidents on Mount Rushmore.

Their cover of the Webb song remains the most popular and widely known of the Highwaymen's songs, being their only song to reach number 1 ("Desperados Waiting for a Train" at number 15 is the next closest). The version by the quartet entered the Hot Country Songs Billboard chart on May 18, 1985, rose to number 1 and spent 20 weeks total on the chart. It finished 1985 as the number 5 country song of the year in terms of  airplay.

Chart positions

Awards
The Highwaymen's version of the song earned songwriter Jimmy Webb a Grammy Award for 1985's "Best Country Song".

References

1985 singles
Columbia Records singles
The Highwaymen (country supergroup) songs
Johnny Cash songs
Glen Campbell songs
Kris Kristofferson songs
Song recordings produced by Chips Moman
Songs written by Jimmy Webb
Waylon Jennings songs
Willie Nelson songs
Black-and-white music videos
1979 songs
Vocal collaborations